William Clay (born 1883 in Belfast, Ireland) was a footballer who played in the Football League for Sheffield United and Leeds City.

References

Sheffield United F.C. players
Leeds City F.C. players
English Football League players
1883 births
Irish association footballers (before 1923)
Association footballers from Belfast
Belfast Celtic F.C. players
Year of death missing
Association footballers not categorized by position
Date of death unknown